Gideon is the platinum-selling ninth studio album by Kenny Rogers. Issued by United Artists Records in 1980, it hit #1 on the Country albums chart and #12 on the main Billboard album chart. It includes the worldwide hit "Don't Fall in Love with a Dreamer" (a duet with Kim Carnes, who co-wrote the entire album with her husband Dave Ellingson).

Gideon is a concept album about a Texas cowboy, and all the songs stick to this theme. The album is a look back at his life in retrospect. In the first song "Gideon Tanner", it is known that Gideon is dead. This and most of the other songs are sung from the point of view of the character himself.

Although the album's only single release was "Don't Fall in Love with a Dreamer", the song "Saying Goodbye" was issued on the B-side to Rogers' top five hit single "Love the World Away".

Gideon reached No. 1 on the Billboard Country charts in 1980.

Track listing

Personnel 
 Kenny Rogers – lead vocals
 Larry Butler – acoustic piano
 Bill Cuomo – acoustic piano
 Steve Glassmeyer – acoustic piano, backing vocals
 Eugene Golden – acoustic piano, backing vocals
 Edgar Struble – clavinet, synthesizers, backing vocals, horn arrangements (7)
 Randy Dorman – guitar
 Patrick Harper – guitar
 Billy Sanford – guitar, dobro
 Chuck Jacobs – bass guitar
 Bobby Daniels – drums, backing vocals
 Jerry Carrigan – percussion
 Bill Justis – string arrangements
 The Sheldon Kurland Strings – strings
 Lea Jane Berinati – backing vocals
 Kim Carnes – backing vocals, lead vocals (4)
 James Cason – backing vocals
 David Ellingson – backing vocals
 Wendy Suits – backing vocals
 Dennis Wilson – backing vocals

Production 
 Producers – Larry Butler and Kenny Rogers
 Engineer – Billy Sherrill
 Mixing – Bill Schnee 
 Recorded at Jack Clement Recording Studios (Nashville, TN)
 Mastered by Doug Sax at the Mastering Lab (Los Angeles, CA)
 Art direction – Bill Burks
 Cover and poster photos – Ken Kragen
 Back cover photo – Reid Miles
 Management – Kragen & Company

Charts

Certifications and sales

References

External links
Gideon album page at Music.com
[ Gideon album page at Allmusic]

1980 albums
Kenny Rogers albums
United Artists Records albums
Albums arranged by Bill Justis
Albums produced by Larry Butler (producer)
Concept albums